Max Reuben Woltman (born 20 August 2003) is an English footballer who plays as a centre forward or attacking midfielder for Liverpool.

Career 
Woltman joined Liverpool as a seven year old, moving through the club's youth structure until he joined the under-18 team for the 2019–20 season.

In January 2021 he signed his first professional contract with the club.

In the 2021–22 season he became a regular for the under-23 team in the Premier League 2.

On 7 December 2021, Woltman made his debut for Liverpool during a 2–1 win in the club's final Champions League group match against Milan.

On 1 September 2022 he joined Doncaster Rovers on a season long loan. His loan spell was cut short when Woltman was recalled to Liverpool on 16 January 2023.

Career statistics

References 

Living people
2003 births
English footballers
Liverpool F.C. players
Association football midfielders
Sportspeople from Wirral
Doncaster Rovers F.C. players
English people of German descent